

Limnephilidae is a family of caddisflies with about 100 genera. They belong to the main lineage of case-constructing caddisflies, the Integripalpia or tube-case caddisflies. The Limnephilidae is one of the most species-rich Trichoptera families of northern temperate regions, but only a few are known from tropical areas and the Southern Hemisphere. For this reason they are often known as northern caddisflies.

Description and ecology
The adults are usually brown in colour, often with narrow mottled or patterned forewings and much broader, transparent hindwings. The aquatic larvae construct portable cases from a wide variety of plant and mineral materials, sometimes even snail shells. Cases of young larvae often looking completely different from those of larger instars. Larvae tend to be eruciform (with a thickset head and thorax), rather slow-moving, and usually feed by browsing algae or scavenging animal remains. They pupate within the larval case, the pupa swimming to the surface before flying away as an adult. For most species the life cycle is completed within one year.

The family includes one extraordinary aberrant genus, Enoicyla, whose larvae are terrestrial, living among moss and leaf litter. The females of Enoicyla have only vestigial wings and are flightless.

Systematics

The Limnephilidae are divided among the four subfamilies listed here (with some notable genera also given). A few genera are not presently assignable to subfamily.

 Dicosmoecinae
 Ironoquia
 Drusinae
 Drusus
 Limnephilinae
 Anabolia
 Chaetopteryx
 Enoicyla
 Glyphotaelius
 Limnephilus
 Parachiona
 Chilostigma
 Pseudostenophylacinae
 Aplatyphylax
 Astenophylina
 Astratodina
 Phylostenax
 Pseudostenophylax
 Incertae sedis
 Allomyia
 Manophylax
 Moselyana
 Pedomoecus

References
Chinery, Michael Collins Guide to the Insects of Britain and Western Europe 1986 (Reprinted 1991)

External links

Family description

Trichoptera families
Taxa named by Friedrich August Rudolph Kolenati
Integripalpia